Panthea greyi is a moth of the family Noctuidae. It has been collected in the mountains of Arizona, New Mexico, Colorado and southern Utah, at elevations of 1524–2545 m.

The wingspan is 38–45 mm for males and 42–50 mm for females. Adults are on wing from June to September.

External links
Revision of the New World Panthea Hübner (Lepidoptera, Noctuidae) with descriptions of 5 new species and 2 new subspecies
Image

Pantheinae
Moths described in 2009